Sir Herbert Nicholls  (11 August 1868 – 11 November 1940) was an Australian judge and politician, who was Chief Justice of Tasmania from 1914 to 1937, and as an independent member of the Tasmanian House of Assembly from 1900 to 1909. In parliament, he served as Attorney-General (1903 to 1904) and Leader of the Opposition (1906 to 1909).

Early life
Nicholls was born in Ballarat, Victoria in 1868, to the English journalist Henry Richard (H. R.) Nicholls and his Irish-born wife Ellen Minchin. He was educated in Ballarat, until his family moved to Hobart, Tasmania in 1883 so his father could take up the editorship of The Mercury newspaper.

Legal career
After working as a mail clerk, Nicholls was articled to Andrew Inglis Clark and Matthew Wilkes Simmons, and was admitted to the Bar in 1892. He graduated with a Bachelor of Laws from the University of Tasmania in 1896, and became a barrister.

Political career
At a 1900 by-election, Nicholls was elected as an independent member of the Tasmanian House of Assembly, representing the multi-member electoral district of Hobart until 1903 when he became the sole member for Central Hobart.

From 1903 to 1904, Nicholls held two ministries in the cabinet of William Propsting: Attorney-General and Minister administering the Education Act. As Attorney-General, Nicholls represented police superintendent Frederick Pedder, the respondent in the landmark High Court case D'Emden v Pedder.

On 29 May 1906, following the state election the eight opposition members of the House of Assembly voted for Nicholls as their leader.

In December 1908, the cabinet of John Evans unanimously decided to appoint Alfred Dobson, Tasmania's Agent-General in London, as third judge of the Supreme Court of Tasmania. Dobson declined the appointment for personal reasons, and Nicholls was offered the role and accepted. He resigned from the Tasmanian Parliament on 1 January 1909.

Judicial career
When the Chief Justice of Tasmania, Sir John Dodds, died in office in June 1914, Nicholls was appointed as his replacement.

As chief justice, Nicholls served as Administrator of Tasmania on occasions when the Governor of Tasmania was absent from the state, or in between the appointment of governors to the role. Nicholls was serving as administrator in October 1923, when the Nationalist government of Sir Walter Lee lost a confidence motion on the floor of the house. Nicholls refused to dissolve the parliament and call an election, and appointed Joseph Lyons as Premier of a minority Labor government when Lee resigned. Nicholls was lieutenant-governor and administrator of the state for nearly three years from December 1930 to August 1933 between the end of Sir James O'Grady's term and the appointment of Sir Ernest Clark.

Honours
Nicholls was made Knight Bachelor in 1916 for his work as chief justice. In 1927, he was made a Knight Commander of the Order of St Michael and St George (KCMG).

Lake Nicholls in Mount Field National Park is named after him. Nicholls was a frequent visitor to the western highlands region where the lake is located, which was a practically unexplored area at the time.

References

 

1868 births
1940 deaths
Chief Justices of Tasmania
Judges of the Supreme Court of Tasmania
Members of the Tasmanian House of Assembly
Independent members of the Parliament of Tasmania
Attorneys-General of Tasmania
Leaders of the Opposition in Tasmania
Australian barristers
Australian Knights Commander of the Order of St Michael and St George
Australian Knights Bachelor
Australian politicians awarded knighthoods
University of Tasmania alumni
Australian people of English descent
Australian people of Irish descent
People from Ballarat